Brown High School may refer to:

 A. L. Brown High School, Kannapolis, North Carolina
 Brown County High School (Illinois), Mount Sterling, Illinois
 Brown Deer High School, Deer, Wisconsin
 Charles A. Brown High School, Charleston, South Carolina
 C. S. Brown High School, Winton, North Carolina
 Edwin Brown High School, Redmond, Oregon
 Lawson Brown High School, Port Elizabeth, South Africa
 Sturgis Brown High School, Sturgis, South Dakota
 Western Brown High School, Mount Orab, Ohio

See also
 Brown School (disambiguation)
 Brown County High School (disambiguation)
 Browne High School, Phoenix, Arizona